Seriki "Sarki" Audu (30 August 1991 – 20 December 2014) was a Nigerian footballer. He played for Gombe United and Lobi Stars in the Nigeria Premier League. He was killed in a car crash on 20 December 2014.

References

1991 births
2014 deaths
Nigerian footballers
Gombe United F.C. players
Lobi Stars F.C. players
Road incident deaths in Nigeria
Association football forwards